Patrick Durcan (5 February 1790 – 1 May 1875) was an Irish Roman Catholic clergyman who served as Bishop of Achonry from 1852 until his death. The son of John and Mary Durcan, he helped to translate the Vulgate into the English language, published in 1857.

He was educated at  St Patrick's College, Maynooth. In 1832 he became parish priest at Collooney. He is buried at the Cathedral of the Annunciation of the Blessed Virgin Mary and St Nathy, Ballaghaderreen.

References

1790 births
1875 deaths
19th-century Roman Catholic bishops in Ireland
Roman Catholic bishops of Achonry
Alumni of St Patrick's College, Maynooth